Kohvik Moon is a restaurant in Tallinn, Estonia, located near the Viking Line harbour.

The restaurant focuses on slavic food. Despite its small size and non-central location, it is so popular that since its opening in December 2009, the restaurant was almost full of customers every day for several months, and its owners often had to work almost round the clock. The restaurant was chosen as the best restaurant in Tallinn of the year in 2010.

References

External links
 

Restaurants in Tallinn
2010 establishments in Estonia